The Eastbay-Foot Locker Cross Country Championships are a series of annual cross country running races held in various regions of the United States to determine the premier cross country runner in various age groups, but mainly serves to find the best prep (high school) cross country athlete in the country. The event began in 1979 by the F. W. Woolworth Company, which initially branded it as the Kinney Cross Country Championships, (for the Kinney Shoes division) at the Morley Field Sports Complex in Balboa Park, San Diego, California before Woolworth rebranded the event in 1993 to the Foot Locker Cross Country Championships for Woolworth's sporting goods company. For most people associated with the sport, the name was just shortened to Foot Locker or even abbreviated in agate results as FL (the ticker symbol of the company today). In 2021 the event was rebranded again as the Eastbay Cross Country Championships after the Foot Locker owned company. The event is the longest-running national cross country race for high school students.

Regional championships
Annually there are a total of four regional championship races (usually in late November), that lead up to the national championship in San Diego in December.

Northeast Regional
The Northeast Region comprises most of the states in New England (Massachusetts, Connecticut, New Hampshire, Maine, Rhode Island, and Vermont) plus Pennsylvania, New York, Maryland, Delaware, New Jersey, and the District of Columbia. After being held at Van Cortlandt Park in the Bronx, New York for its first 30 years, in 2009 it moved to Sunken Meadow State Park in Kings Park, Long Island, before moving back to Van Cortlandt Park in 2012.

Midwest Regional
The Midwest Region comprises the heartland states and is by far the largest region in the FLCCC series, which has states including: Minnesota, Wisconsin, Iowa, North Dakota, South Dakota, Illinois, Nebraska, Colorado, Kansas, Ohio, Indiana, Missouri, and Michigan. This event is held at the University of Wisconsin–Parkside yearly.

South Regional 
The South Region is made up of states in the southern and southeastern United States including: Florida, Texas, Kentucky, South Carolina, North Carolina, Alabama, Georgia, Oklahoma, Tennessee, Virginia, Arkansas, Mississippi, West Virginia, and Louisiana. The South Region event is held annually at McAlpine Creek Park in Charlotte, North Carolina.

West Regional 
The West Region is considered by many to be the most potent region with the most runners appearing in the national championship. States included in the west: California, Washington, Utah, Idaho, Montana, Arizona, New Mexico, Nevada, Alaska, Hawaii, Oregon, Wyoming, and Overseas Military. This regional race is generally conducted at Mount San Antonio College in Walnut, California and is generally a week later than the other three regional races.

National Championship 

The Foot Locker National Cross Country Championship is held annually in San Diego's Balboa Park (though it has been held in Orlando, Florida on seven occasions), just as it started in 1979. A total of 40 elite cross country runners race , for superiority in both individual and regional standings. The top ten runners from each region are invited to the national championship in San Diego, with each region also sending two alternates. From 1981–2004, the race had 32 runners, with each region sending eight. In 1979–1980, there were 35 runners from five regions.

Race divisions 

The number of divisions vastly differs on the region, however there are races set aside for specific age groups and one or two open events sponsored by Nike for athletes not in high school (parents, fans, supporters) to compete in.

Common regional divisions 

Seeded Girls
Seeded Boys
Freshman Girls
Freshman Boys
Sophomore Girls
Sophomore Boys
Junior Girls 
Junior Boys
Senior Girls
Senior Boys

Additional regional divisions 

The West Regional contains the following additional divisions:
7th and 8th grade

The South Regional contains the following additional divisions:
Nike Masters for both men and women
Ages 10 and under
Ages 11 and 12
Ages 13 and 14

Courses 

The Foot Locker Cross Country Championships, then referred to as the Kinney Cross Country Championships started off as a small event in San Diego, California in 1979. The races moved to Orlando for the 1981 and 1982 national championships, but quickly was moved back to Balboa Park in San Diego in 1983. Additional races run in Orlando were held in 1997, 1998, 1999, 2000, and 2001.

Orlando, Florida 

The Orlando course was extremely flat, but deceivingly slow in terms of runners' times. Patches of grass and sand were scattered throughout the flat, 5,000m course.

All-Time Orlando Kinney/FL Cross Country Championships Record—Boys: Dathan Ritzenhein, 14:29, 1999

All-Time Orlando Kinney/FL Cross Country Championships Record—Girls: Amber Trotter, 16:24, 2001

San Diego, California 

Balboa Park in San Diego has served as the most frequent venue for the national championships. The course is winded in a figure-8 fashion through the Morley Field portion of the nearly  park. There is no shortage of hills and mounds, which makes this course the definitive cross country course. (Although the San Diego venue has always been Balboa Park, the Championships in 1979 and 1980 were run on a course other than Morley Field—a course on the western edge of Balboa Park.)

All-Time Balboa Park San Diego/CA Cross Country Championships Record—Boys: Reuben Reina, 14:36, 1985

All-Time Balboa Park San Diego/CA Cross Country Championships Record—Girls: Melody Fairchild, 16:39, 1990

Past results 

In addition to a national champion being crowned in each gender division, the top 15 finishers in each gender division receive All-American honors and an overall team champion is declared based on which region had won the meet.

Repeat national champions 

There have only been a total of six girls and five boys who have repeated as Foot Locker national champions. None have been national champions three times at the Kinney/FL Cross Country Championships.

Boys with two National Championships 

  Grant Fisher won in 2013 and 2014
  Edward Cheserek won in 2011 and 2012. 
  Lukas Verzbicas won in 2009 and 2010.
  Dathan Ritzenhein won in 1999 and 2000. 
  Abdirizak Mohamud won in 1996 and 1997.

Girls with two National Championships 

  Claudia Lane won in 2016 and 2017.
  Anna Rohrer won in 2012 and 2014.
  Jordan Hasay won in 2005 and 2008. 
  Erin Sullivan won in 1997 and 1998. 
  Melody Fairchild won in 1989 and 1990. 
  Erin Keogh won in 1985 and 1986.

Foot Locker Champions to win NCAA titles

There have been a total of sixteen Foot Locker Champions to win NCAA Titles in Cross Country, Indoor Track and Field, or Outdoor Track and Field, including eleven men and five women.

Alumni

 Jen Rhines
 Deena Kastor (née Drossin)
 Amy Rudolph
 Milena Glusac
 Dathan Ritzenhein
 Alan Webb
 Ryan Hall
 Alan Culpepper
 Chris Derrick
 Adam Goucher
 Kara Goucher (née Wheeler)
 Jordan Hasay
 Galen Rupp
 Sara Slattery (née Gorton)
 Steve Slattery
 Suzy Favor Hamilton
 Lauren Fleshman
 Chris Solinsky
 Molly Huddle
 Sara Hall (née Bei)
 Cheri Goddard-Kenah
 Meb Keflezighi
 Marc Davis

See also

Gatorade Player of the Year awards#Cross Country
Champs Sports Bowl (sponsored by a Foot Locker division)

References

External links
Foot Locker Cross Country Championships – Official website
 NCAA Division I Championships (Men)
 NCAA Division I Championships (Women)

Cross country running in the United States
Cross country running competitions
High school sports in the United States
Foot Locker
Balboa Park (San Diego)